Charles "Charlie" Simpkins (born October 19, 1963) was an American athlete who competed mainly in the triple jump. He was born in Aiken, South Carolina.

He competed for the United States in the 1992 Summer Olympics held in Barcelona, Spain in the triple jump where he won the silver medal.  He had previously represented the United States at the 1988 Summer Olympics, finishing 5th.

References

 
 

American male triple jumpers
Olympic silver medalists for the United States in track and field
Athletes (track and field) at the 1988 Summer Olympics
Athletes (track and field) at the 1992 Summer Olympics
Living people
1963 births
Sportspeople from Aiken, South Carolina
Medalists at the 1992 Summer Olympics
Universiade medalists in athletics (track and field)
Universiade gold medalists for the United States
Medalists at the 1987 Summer Universiade